Bartosz Łosiak (born 14 May 1992) is a Polish Olympic beach volleyball player. He is a defender and plays on the right side.

References

External links
 
 
 
 
 

Polish beach volleyball players
1992 births
Living people
Olympic beach volleyball players of Poland
Beach volleyball players at the 2016 Summer Olympics
People from Jastrzębie-Zdrój
Beach volleyball defenders
Beach volleyball players at the 2020 Summer Olympics